Märchen der Völker is a German television series.

See also
List of German television series

External links
 

1978 German television series debuts
1978 German television series endings
German children's animated television series
Television shows based on fairy tales
German-language television shows
ZDF original programming